The Canadian Screen Award for Best Actress in a Continuing Leading Dramatic Role is an annual Canadian television award, presented by the Academy of Canadian Cinema & Television to the best leading performance by an actress in a Canadian television series. Previously presented as part of the Gemini Awards, since 2013 it has been presented as part of the Canadian Screen Awards.

Prior to the creation of the Gemini Awards in 1986, the predecessor ACTRA Awards presented only a single award for Best Performance in a Continuing Role, differentiating neither by gender nor for the distinction between comedy and drama.

In August 2022, the Academy announced that beginning with the 11th Canadian Screen Awards in 2023, a gender-neutral award for Best Leading Performance in a Drama Series will be presented.

1980s

1990s

2000s

2010s

2020s

References

External links
 Official website

Best Actress

Awards established in 1986
1986 establishments in Canada